William Duffy (February 1, 1958 – March 24, 2020) known professionally as William Dufris or Bill Dufris, was an American voice actor and audiobook narrator.

Career 
Dufris began his audio career in London, where he appeared in several BBC Radio plays with Kathleen Turner, Sharon Gless, Stockard Channing, and Helena Bonham-Carter. Moreover, he worked with director Dirk Maggs on his audio drama productions of Spider-Man (where he voiced the title role of Peter Parker), Judge Dredd, Voyage and An American Werewolf in London.

These experiences led Dufris to co-found the audio production company The Story Circle, Ltd in the UK. Upon returning to the United States, Dufris founded Mind's Eye Productions and co-founded Rocky Coast Radio Theatre and The AudioComics Company, for which he has been producer, director, actor, and engineer. For AudioComics he directed Starstruck, the first season of Horrorscopes, Titanium Rain, Honey West, and The Batson's for the AudioComics Kids line. He also directed Arigon Starr’s audio comedy Super Indian for Native Voices at the Autry in Los Angeles.

He was best known for voicing the title character in the American English dub of the British children's animated series Bob the Builder until its ninth season. Dufris also voiced Elvis and Dougan in the stop motion TV series Rocky and the Dodos for Cosgrove Hall and dubbed several anime films such as X, Appleseed and two of the Lupin III films. He is also well known for his narration of the Pendragon books, written by D.J.McHale. 

Dufris was on the Advisory Board of the National Audio Theatre Festivals, Inc. in addition to being a Norman Corwin Award Committee member. He was a guest instructor and performer at the 2005–2007 Audio Theatre Workshops, appearing in the world premiere works The Best Place to Grow Pumpkins, Rewind, Extra-Ordinary, and Histories.

In 2018, Dufris and Jack Bowman co-founded the audiobook company Dagaz Media.

Dufris died of cancer on March 24, 2020 at the age of 62.

Awards 
Dufris was nominated twelve times as an audiobook finalist for the Audio Publishers Association's Audie Awards, winning in 2012 for Best Non-Fiction. He also garnered 24 Golden Earphones Awards through AudioFile Magazine, and was named by AudioFile as "One Of The Best Voices At The End Of The Century." Publishers Weekly called his performance of Neal Stephenson's novel Anathem "a delight for the ears".

Partial list of works

As voice actor
Angel Cop
Appleseed
Bob the Builder - Bob, Farmer Pickles, Mr. Beasley, Mr. Sabatini, Skip (US dub)
Judge
Lupin III (The Secret of Mamo and Goodbye Lady Liberty) - Arsène Lupin III
New Dominion Tank Police
Patlabor: The Movie
Patlabor 2: The Movie
Rocky and the Dodos - Elvis, Dougan
X
Venus Wars

As audiobook reader
Playaway reader
Humphrey Audio Collection Books 8-11

Tantor Media

Destroyermen series: Into the Storm, Crusade, Maelstrom, Distant Thunders, Rising Tides, Firestorm, Iron Gray Sea
The Enduring Flame series: The Phoenix Unchained, The Phoenix Endangered, The Phoenix Transformed
Holmes on the Range series: Holmes on the Range, On the Wrong Track, The Black Dove, The Crack in the Lens, World's Greatest Sleuth!
The Imager Portfolio series: Imager,  Imager's Challenge, Imager's Intrigue, Scholar, Princeps, Untitled
Isaac Asimov's Robot series: The Caves of Steel, The Naked Sun, The Robots of Dawn;
A Connecticut Yankee in King Arthur's Court
The Adventures of Huckleberry Finn
The Adventures of Tom Sawyer
All Other Nights
Ask a Mexican
Books
The California Roll
The Call
Chariots of the Gods
The Christmas Chronicles
Company
Containment
Controlled Burn
Dali & I
Digging for the Truth
The Disagreement
The Dream of Perpetual Motion
The Duel and Other Stories
The End of Food
Fever
Fieldwork
Fletch Won
Flying Through Midnight
Frozen
The Futurist
Golf My Own Damn Way
The Good Psychologist
Haze
Herland
Holy Water
I'm Dying Up Here
Ignore Everybody
Ilustrado
Johnny Got His Gun
Killing Che
The Last Days of Krypton
Lord Vishnu's Love Handles
Mad Dogs
The Man with the Iron Heart
The Many Deaths of the Firefly Brothers
Me and a Guy Named Elvis
Odyssey of the Gods
Pandora's Legion
Percival's Planet
The Red Badge of Courage
Replay
Saint Patrick's Battalion
The Shadowkiller
The Sheriff of Yrnameer
Snark
Soul Catcher
Stick to Drawing Comics, Monkey Brain!
The Third Brother
Time Bandit
The Way to Win
White Flag Down
White Shadow
The World to Come
You Call the Shots

Other titles
Adventures of Huckleberry Finn by Mark Twain
A Journey With Strange Bedfellows by Jan C J Jones
Anathem by Neal Stephenson
Cryptonomicon by Neal Stephenson
The Ethical Assassin
Shadowland
The Pendragon Adventure series
Flappers and Philosophers by F. Scott Fitzgerald
Danse Macabre by Stephen King
Woken Furies by Richard K. Morgan
Replay by Ken Grimwood
Old Man's War by John Scalzi
Awaken Your Strongest Self by Neil Fiore
''The Maltese Falcon by Dashiell Hammett

References

External links

Profile at AudioFile Magazine
http://www.tantor.com/NarratorDetail.asp?Narrator=Dufris_W

1958 births
2020 deaths
American male voice actors
Audiobook narrators
Male actors from Maine
People from Houlton, Maine
Deaths from cancer in Maine